The 2018–19 season was Zob Ahan Football Club's 18th season in the Iran Pro League, and their 23rd consecutive season in the top division of Iranian football. They also competed in the Hazfi Cup and AFC Champions League, and had their 48th year in existence as a football club.

Players

First team squad
As of 30 May 2019.

Transfers

In

Out

Competitions

Overview

Iran Pro League

Standings

Results summary

Results by round

Matches

AFC Champions League

AFC Champions League 2019

Qualifying play-offs

Group stage

Statistics

Appearances 

|}

Hazfi Cup

Matches

Top scorers
Includes all competitive matches. The list is sorted by shirt number when total goals are equal.

Last updated on 15 May 2018

Friendlies and pre-season goals are not recognized as competitive match goals.

Top assistors
Includes all competitive matches. The list is sorted by shirt number when total assistors are equal.

Last updated on 14 May 2018

Friendlies and Pre season goals are not recognized as competitive match assist.

Disciplinary record
Includes all competitive matches. Players with 1 card or more included only.

Last updated on 15 May 2019

Goals conceded 
 Updated on 30 May 2016

Own goals 
 Updated on 5 January 2016

Club

Other information

See also

 2018–19 Persian Gulf Pro League
 2018–19 Hazfi Cup
 2019 AFC Champions League

References

External links
Iran Premier League Statistics
Persian League

2018-19
Iranian football clubs 2018–19 season